Pimlico is a London Underground station in Pimlico, City of Westminster, on the Victoria line between Victoria and Vauxhall in Zone 1. Pimlico was the last station on the Victoria line to open in 1972, and is the only station on the line without an interchange to another, the deepest on the line, and the only one without step-free access. It is the main transport access point for the Tate Britain gallery.

Location and name
The station is at the junction of Bessborough Street and Rampayne Street. Both it and the area are believed to be named after a 16th-century publican, Ben Pimlico, who was well known for brewing nut-brown ale. London Buses routes 2, 24, 36, 185, 360 and C10 and night route N2 serve the station.

Pimlico is the only station on the Victoria line which does not have an interchange with another Underground or National Rail line, and it is the only station to not have step-free access on the entire line.

History

When the extension of the Victoria line to Brixton via Stockwell was approved in 1966, there were discussions about building an additional station between Victoria and the River Thames. It was not included in the original plans for the extension, as there was concern it would be financially viable or support enough footfall. However, there was a strong local support for a station, and it gave better access to the Tate Gallery (now Tate Britain). The Crown Estate offered free land for a site, leading to parliamentary approval on 28 June 1968. The extension to Brixton opened on 23 July 1971, but Pimlico station was not yet complete, and trains passed through slowly without stopping.

The station was opened by the Lord Mayor of Westminster on 14 September 1972 – more than a year after the rest of the line had become fully operational – and began serving regular passengers that afternoon. Pimlico was the last Underground station to open until the first section of the Piccadilly line's Heathrow extension was opened to Hatton Cross in 1975. After Blackhorse Road station was re-sited to interchange with the Victoria line in 1981, Pimlico became the only station on the line without any direct connections to any other.

In March 2015, the station was chosen to be the test for 'Wayfindr', an app that helps visually impaired people navigate their way through the station using iBeacon devices installed at the station. The app was successful, leading to a $1 million grant from Google and installation at other stations.

The station was closed in 2020 from 21 March to 18 May in response to the COVID-19 pandemic, where non-essential travel was restricted. In July 2021, the station was temporarily closed again because of a lack of staff, after over 300 Transport for London (TfL) staff self-isolated as a result of COVID.

Gallery

References
Citations

Sources

External links
 London Transport Museum Photographic Archive
 
 
 
 

Victoria line stations
London Underground Night Tube stations
Tube stations in the City of Westminster
Railway stations in Great Britain opened in 1972
Tube station